Lord Young may refer to:
 George Young, Lord Young (1829–1907), Senator of the College of Justice in Edinburgh
 Michael Young, Baron Young of Dartington (1915–2002), British sociologist, social activist and politician who coined the term "meritocracy"
 David Young, Baron Young of Graffham (1932–2022), British Conservative cabinet minister and businessman
 George Young, Baron Young of Cookham (born 1941), Conservative baronet ennobled in 2015
 Anthony Young, Baron Young of Norwood Green (born 1942), British minister and Labour Party life peer

Lady Young may refer to their wives or to: